Robert Howard Ralston (born July 2, 1938, in Upland, California) is an American pianist and organist who performed on television's The Lawrence Welk Show from 1963 until 1982, when the series ended.

Career

A native of Southern California, Ralston graduated from Montebello High School in 1955 and attended Wheaton College in Illinois on a full music scholarship. Before finishing his degree, he transferred to the University of Southern California in Los Angeles, from which he earned a Bachelor of Music degree in composition and accompanying in 1964. During his college years, Ralston played six nights a week with the Freddy Martin orchestra (1959-1962) at Los Angeles's Coconut Grove nightclub, where in 1962, Welk invited him on his show as a guest musician.

Playing with Freddy Martin lasted until the summer of 1963, when one of Welk's original pianists, Jerry Burke, fell ill and soon died, and Ralston was hired on a permanent basis. The Welk programs feature Ralston's piano and organ solos, but they frequently include his performances as a singer, dancer, and comedian. He arranged music and continued to perform for the Music Makers live and on television until 1982 when Welk retired from active performing. Since 1988, he has been the pianist and organist for the Founders Church of Religious Science in Los Angeles, an affiliate of the Centers for Spiritual Living.

Throughout his career, Ralston has recorded several hundred albums; many of them as a solo artist or with bandleaders, including Welk, Ray Conniff, and Billy Vaughn. He has also been active in the preservation of theater pipe organs across America and has been a guest conductor for several symphony orchestras. Ralston appeared as host in a 1999 PBS rerun of Lawrence Welk's "Time" show. He still holds regular concerts in his home with various guest vocalists.

Personal life
Ralston and his Dutch-born wife, Fietje, have been married since March 3, 1963, and they have two adult children. The Ralstons reside in Granada Hills in the San Fernando Valley in Los Angeles.

Ralston's parents were Bradford Ralston and the former Marjorie Elizabeth Norton (1911–1998), an early cartoonist for Walt Disney. In 1928, Disney hired her as an inker, the thirteenth person employed by the new company. She was the first female voice actor for Minnie Mouse in the 1929 cartoon Wild Waves. Ralston's brother, Frederick Carleton "Rick" Ralston (born August 25, 1941), founded Crazy Shirts in Honolulu, Hawaii. His paternal aunt and uncle, Esther Ralston and Howard Ralston (1904–1992), were actors.

Legal issues 
Ralston was arrested in 1984 for the molestation of a 13-year-old boy that he met in Times Square and brought to California. When police raided his home, pornographic slides were discovered of at least 13 other boys. Ralston eventually pled guilty to one felony count of committing a lewd act with a child under age 14. In a plea bargain with the District Attorney's Office, three other lewd conduct charges involving two other boys were dismissed. Los Angeles police detective Steve Hales stated outside the courtroom, "'In all my years working with sexually exploited children, that was the most inappropriate sentence on a pedophile I've ever seen." Ralson was sentenced to 5 years probation and no contact with children.

References

External links
 Bob Ralston official webpage

1938 births
Living people
Musicians from California
American keyboardists
USC Thornton School of Music alumni
Wheaton College (Illinois) alumni
People from Montebello, California
People from San Bernardino County, California
People from Los Angeles
People from the San Fernando Valley
Theatre organists
Mensans
Lawrence Welk
20th-century American pianists
American male pianists
21st-century organists
American people convicted of child sexual abuse